SN 2005bc was a Type Ia supernova occurring in the barred spiral galaxy NGC 5698, located in the northern constellation of Boötes. SN 2005bc was discovered on 2 April 2005 by LOSS and independently by Tim Puckett and L. Cox. The supernova was at magnitude 16.4 at discovery, and quickly rose to a peak magnitude of around 15.3 (in visible light) just over a week after discovery. By mid-May, the supernova had faded to 17th magnitude.

The host galaxy, NGC 5698, along with the supernova lie approximately 129 million light-years (~40 million parsecs) from Earth. As the supernova was of Type Ia, its progenitor star was a compact white dwarf star that exceeded the Chandrasekhar limit.

References

External links
 Light curves and spectra on the Open Supernova Catalog
 IAUC 8504

Supernovae
20050402
2005 in science
Boötes